Training for Trouble is a Hardy Boys novel. It was first published in 2000.

Plot summary
The Hardy Boys decide to go to a sports facility in Bayport. They see many competing there, but they find out about a mysterious figure creating 'accidents'. Now they must find him before more accidents happen.

References

2000 American novels
The Hardy Boys books
2000 children's books